Julia Watson (born 13 September 1953) is a British actress known for playing Barbara 'Baz' Wilder in the BBC medical drama Casualty in 1986, 1995–98 and again from 2003 to 2004.

Personal life

Julia Watson was born on 13 September 1953 in Maesteg and brought up in the Derby area. Talking about her parents in an interview with the Casualty fansite, holby.tv, she comments that they were fantastic and devoted. She cites this as reason why she feels so torn between career and family. She is married to the writer, David Harsent; they met at a dinner party and eventually married in a register office in Fulham. They have a daughter, Hannah, born in 1990 and Watson says of her that she is their "greatest born and blessing."

Career

Watson studied Drama and English at Exeter University. Previous jobs include founding a Community Centre in Newcastle and working in Education at the Nottingham Theatre. In addition to her acting roles, she has edited anthologies of poetry and readings for weddings, funerals and naming ceremonies.

List of television, theatre and radio appearances

Television

Theatre
1980s
Major Barbara – played Jenny Hill in a 1982 production at Lyttelton Theatre
Danton's Death – played Lady Eugenie in a 1984 production at Olivier Theatre
She Stoops to Conquer – played Kate Hardcastle in a 1985 production at National Theatre
An Act of Faith – played Helen in a 1985 production at National Theatre Studio
John Bull – played in a 1987 production at Bristol Old Vic
Love on the Plastic – played in a 1987 production at Half Moon Theatre
1990s
Six Fools – played in a 1992 production at Old Red Lion Theatre
Joking Apart – played Anthea in a 1995 production at Greenwich Theatre
2000s
Little Women – played Marmee in a 2006 touring production
Tosca’s Kiss – played Rebecca West in a 2006 production at Orange Tree Theatre
2010 onwards
Amy's View – played Esme in a 2010 production at Nottingham Playhouse
An Ideal Husband – played Lady Chiltern in a 2010 production at Nottingham Playhouse
My Family and Other Animals – played Durrell's mother in a 2011 production at Theatre Royal, York
Love's Comedy – played Mrs Halm in a 2012 production at Orange Tree Theatre
The Stepmother – played Charlotte Gaydon in a 2013 production at Orange Tree Theatre
The Man Who Pays the Piper – played Mrs Fairley in a 2013 production at Orange Tree Theatre
Other
The holby.tv fansite also lists Leonce and Lena, The Philanthropist, A Midsummer Night's Dream, Absent Friends, Bartholomew Fair, Cabaret, Canterbury Tales, Charley's Aunt, Exchange, Hand it to Them, Ludwig & Bertie, Pinocchio, The Ghost Train, The Magicolympic Games and Twelfth Night.

Radio

The Comedy of Errors
Shadow Play (31 May 1999 on BBC Radio 4)

References

External links
 

Living people
1953 births
People from Maesteg
People from Derby
20th-century British actresses
21st-century British actresses